WS-MetaDataExchange is a web services protocol specification, published by BEA Systems, IBM, Microsoft, and SAP.  WS-MetaDataExchange is part of the
WS-Federation roadmap; and is designed to work in conjunction with WS-Addressing, WSDL and WS-Policy to allow retrieval of metadata
about a Web Services endpoint.

It uses a SOAP message to request metadata, and so goes beyond the basic technique of appending "?wsdl" to a service name's URL

See also
 List of web service specifications
 Web services

References

External links
 W3C Working Draft of WS-MetadataExchange
 WS-MetadataExchange Specification

Web service specifications